Eric Alexander Winkel is an Islamic scholar focusing on Ibn 'Arabi's teaching. He studied the Futuhat al-Makiyya for over 23 years. During his tenure as senior research fellow at the International Institute of Advanced Islamic Studies (IAIS) in Malaysia, he started to explore correlations between Islam and modern sciences and laid the groundwork for the connections between Ibn 'Arabi's vision and new directions in physics and mathematics. Since then he has been dedicating his life to translating the Futūḥāt al-Makkīyah (The Openings Revealed in Makkah) into English.

Biography 
Winkel was born in Manhattan, Kansas, United States. Around 12 years old, his family moved to Switzerland and he attended 7th–11th grades in International School of Geneva, Switzerland. After moved back to America, in 1979 he attended Freshman Honors Program at University of Delaware, Newark for a year, before gained a B.A. in Religion from Haverford College, Pennsylvania in 1982.  In 1985 he received his Master's in South Asia Studies from University of Pennsylvania, Philadelphia; then in 1988 he earned the PhD in Government and International Studies from University of South Carolina, Columbia.

The encounter with Ibn ʿArabī occurred from young age when Winkel read Ralph Austen's Sufis of Andalusia, and at the age of 17 years old he proceeded to delve into Ibn al-ʿArabī’s works as much as he could. His doctoral thesis, titled "The Ontological Status of Politics in Islam and The Epistemology of Islamic Revival", later became his monograph, Islam and the Living Law: The Ibn al-'Arabi Approach.

Since 2012 he started the Futuhat Project, the first-ever complete translation and commentary of the Futūḥāt al-Makkīyah into English, titled "The Openings Revealed in Makkah". Futūḥāt al-Makkīyah is a magnum opus of over 10,000 pages written by 12th century sufi master Ibn al-ʿArabī; and currently (end of 2022) there are 4 volumes of the English translation out of the planned 19 volumes, published by Pir Press in New York. During Covid (2020–2022), Dr. Winkel held weekly sessions on Ibn al-ʿArabī and the Futūḥāt which were recorded and released on YouTube. The series of lectures can be found on youtube as "Insights from (Muhyiddin) Ibn Arabi". More than 100 hours of public engagement inspired the publication of "An Illustrated Guide to Ibn Arabi" in 2022.

Work and career 
 2012–present: Community scholar, working full-time on the "Futuhat Project".
 2012–2012: Senior Fulbright Scholar at Institut Agama Islam Negeri Sumatera Utara, Medan, Indonesia
 2010–2012: Senior Research Fellow at the Institute of Advanced Islamic Studies (IAIS), Kuala Lumpur, Malaysia
 2008–2009: Foreign Faculty Member at National College of Arts Lahore, Pakistan

Publications 

 The Openings Revealed in Makkah (4 volumes, translator and commentator), Pir Press, New York, 2020–2022.
 An Illustrated Guide to Ibn Arabi, Pir Press, New York, 2022.
 Envisioning the Future: An Islamic Perspective of Visions of the Future, Kuala Lumpur, 2011.
 Educational Philosophy in Malaysia. Monograph, University of Malaya, 2006.
 Damascus Steel (a novel). CAR&D, 2001.
 Islam and the Living Law: The Ibn al-'Arabi Approach. Karachi: Oxford University Press, 1997.
 Mysteries of Purity: Ibn al-'Arabi's Asrar al-Taharah (a translation of a section of the Futūḥāt al-Makkīyah), Notre Dame: Cross-Cultural Publications, 1995.

References

External links 

 Ibn Arabi
 The Futuhat Project
 The Muhyiddin Ibn Arabi Society

Living people
Year of birth missing (living people)
University of South Carolina alumni
University of Pennsylvania alumni
Haverford College alumni
University of Delaware alumni
International School of Geneva alumni